Cláudia Abreu (born 12 October 1970) is a Brazilian actress, screenwriter and producer.

Filmography

Films 
1996 - Tieta do Agreste - (Cacá Diegues)
1997 - Four Days in September (O que É Isso, Companheiro?) - (Bruno Barreto)
1997 - Guerra de Canudos - (Sérgio Rezende)
1997 - Ed Mort - (Alain Fresnot)
2001 - O Xangô de Baker Street - (Miguel Faria, Jr.)
2003 - The Man of the Year (José Henrique Fonseca)
2003 - The Middle of the World - (Vicente Amorim)
2008 - Os Desafinados - (Walter Lima, Jr.)

on TV 
A Lei do Amor - Heloísa Martins Bezerra (Helô)
Geração Brasil - Pamela Parker
Cheias de Charme - Chayene (Jociléia Imbuzeiro Migon)
Três Irmãs - Dora Jequitibá Áquila
Belíssima - Vitória Rocha Assumpção / Vitória Güney Moura
Celebridade - Maria Laura Prudente da Costa
O Quinto dos Infernos - Amélia de Leuchtenberg
Brava Gente - "O diabo ri por último" - Mulher do Zé
Força de um Desejo - Olívia Xavier
Labirinto - Liliane
Pátria Minha - Alice Proença Pelegrini Laport
Anos Rebeldes - Heloísa Andrade Brito
Barriga de Aluguel - Clara Ribeiro
Que Rei Sou Eu? - Princess Juliette
Fera Radical - Ana Paula Flores
O Outro - Zezinha
Hipertensão - Luzia
Desalma

References

External links

 

1970 births
Living people
Actresses from Rio de Janeiro (city)
Brazilian people of Portuguese descent
Brazilian film actresses
Brazilian television actresses
Brazilian telenovela actresses
21st-century Brazilian actresses